Henrik Schaefer (born 1968 in Bochum) is a German conductor.

He is Music Director of the Opera of Gothenburg (Sweden) 

Alongside his work at this house he keeps up an impressive carriere as a guest conductor with the Gävle Symphony, Danish Radio Symphony, Osaka Philharmonic, Helsingborg Symphony, Tokyo Symphony, Norrköping Symphony, Sapporo Symphony, Arctic Philharmonic, Sendai Philharmonic, Rouen, Stuttgarter Philharmoniker, Tokyo Metropolitan, Volksoper Wien, Bogota Philharmonic, New Japan Philharmonic, Nederlands Philharmonisch, Hongkong Philharmonic and the orchestras in Nürnberg, Curitiba, Aalborg, Antwerp, Porto Alegre, Enschede, Kristiansand and Belo Horizonte.

At the age of six he began playing the violin and changed to viola when he was 14. After his studies in Essen and Freiburg with Prof. Grahe, Prof. Koch, Prof. Kashkashian and Prof. Luethy, he became the then youngest member of the Berlin Philharmonic Orchestra at the age of 22.

As well as playing in the orchestra he studied conducting in Leipzig with Prof. Rohde from 1994 to 1998. After his first smaller projects as a conductor he led the Berlin Philharmonic Orchestra for the first time in 1999 for the MusikBox project of Sony music (Ludwig van Beethoven's symphony no. 5, Robert Schumann's symphony no. 3 and Felix Mendelssohn's symphony no. 4). In May 2000 he was chosen from numerous applicants to become Claudio Abbado’s assistant with the Berlin Philharmonic Orchestra and already in December 2000 he led all rehearsals for the production of Richard Wagner's Tristan in Tokyo, due to Abbado’s ailing health.

Since then he has conducted the orchestra on many occasions in Berlin and Salzburg (Falstaff, Parsifal) and took the dress rehearsal for Claudio Abbado’s last concert with the Berlin Philharmonic Orchestra with Gustav Mahler's symphony no. 7 in Vienna in May 2002.

His opera repertoire includes The Magic Flute, Don Giovanni, Figaro, Cosi fan Tutte, Eugen Onegin, Faust, La Traviata, La Boheme, Madama Butterfly, Falstaff, Hamlet, Les dialogues des Carmelites, Hänsel and Gretel, Daphne, Elektra, Ariadne, The Flying Dutchman, Rheingold, Walküre, Siegfried, Götterdämmerung, Tristan and Parsifal.
He has recorded numerous symphonic works by Badings, Raff and recently the first opera by the romantic Swedish composer Wilhelm Stenhammar with the Norrköping Symphony for the label Sterling.

References

External links
 Official website of Henrik Schaefer

German male conductors (music)
1968 births
Living people
People from Bochum
21st-century German conductors (music)
21st-century German male musicians